William David McCalden (20 September 1951 – 15 October 1990) was active in the British political far-right. After moving to the United States, he was co-founder of the Institute for Historical Review in 1978 and advocated Holocaust denial.

Early life
McCalden was born in Belfast, Northern Ireland. He left Northern Ireland in 1972 to study at Goldsmiths College in London. During his time at University he was widely known as "revisionist Dave". McCalden was noted for his long hair and readiness to debate with left-wing fellow students. He graduated in 1974 with a Certificate in Education (Sociology).

Political life
McCalden first became involved in politics as a member of the National Front, where he became editor of the party newspaper Nationalist News. A leading supporter of John Kingsley Read, McCalden transferred his allegiance to the National Party soon after Read and other NF members founded the party in 1976. He became a leading contributor to the party journal Britain First. He was an active member of the Hunt Saboteurs Association and edited their journal HOWL for a couple of years. He was expelled from the HSA in June 1978, after a debate and vote at their Newcastle AGM, for his contributions to "racist magazines".  His other works at this time included Beacon, another journal, and allegedly the book Nuremberg & Other War Crimes Trials (1978), although this was initially written under the pseudonym Richard Harwood, one shared with another Holocaust denier Richard Verrall.

Emigration to US and Holocaust Revisionism
McCalden emigrated to the United States and arrived in California in 1978. After meeting neo-nazi and Holocaust denier Willis Carto, the two men founded the Institute for Historical Review, of which McCalden was appointed Director and Editor-in-Chief (although he generally operated under the name Lewis Brandon in these roles). McCalden soon garnered a reputation as an advocate of Holocaust denial and became the leading organizational figure within the IHR. 

In 1980, acting as "Lewis Brandon" and on behalf of the IHR, McCalden offered a $50,000 reward for proof that Jews were gassed to death in the Auschwitz Concentration Camp. After McCalden declined an acceptance by Auschwitz survivor Mel Mermelstein, a lawsuit was filed by public interest attorney William John Cox. In October 1981, a Los Angeles County Superior Court judge ruled that "this court does take judicial notice of the fact that Jews were gassed to death at Auschwitz Concentration Camp in Poland during the summer of 1944."  The judge went on to say, "It is simply a fact." McCalden and Carto had a falling out over the case, and in 1981 McCalden left the IHR.

McCalden set up his own group Truth Missions. Under this imprint he published journals such as Revisionist Reprints, Holocaust News and David McCalden's Revisionist Newsletter and books including The Amazing, Rapidly Shrinking "Holocaust" (1988).

Death
On 15 October 1990, at the age of 39, McCalden died in El Segundo, California, from complications due to viral pneumonia caused by AIDS. He had been suffering from AIDS since November 1988. He was survived by his second wife, Viviana, and their daughter.

References

1951 births
1990 deaths
British Holocaust deniers
Far-right politicians from Northern Ireland
AIDS-related deaths in California
Alumni of Goldsmiths, University of London
National Front (UK) politicians
Politicians from Belfast
People from El Segundo, California
20th-century politicians from Northern Ireland